Ceres is an unincorporated community in Clayton County, Iowa, United States. Ceres once had a post office, which has since been abandoned. The county seat of Elkader lies approximately 11 miles to the west.

References

Unincorporated communities in Clayton County, Iowa
Unincorporated communities in Iowa